UFC 240: Holloway vs. Edgar was a mixed martial arts event produced by the Ultimate Fighting Championship that took place on July 27, 2019 at Rogers Place in Edmonton, Alberta, Canada.

Background
A UFC Featherweight Championship bout between champion Max Holloway and former UFC Lightweight Champion Frankie Edgar headlined the event. The pairing was scheduled twice before, first at UFC 218 and then at UFC 222, but scrapped for Edgar and Holloway injuries, respectively.

A women's flyweight bout between former Invicta FC Bantamweight Champion Lauren Murphy and Mara Romero Borella was initially scheduled for this event. On June 20, matchmakers moved the bout a week ahead to UFC on ESPN: Covington vs. Lawler.

A heavyweight bout between Tanner Boser and Giacomo Lemos was scheduled. On July 25, the bout was scrapped due to Lemos testing positive for an unspecified banned substance.

Results

Bonus awards
The following fighters received $50,000 bonuses.
Fight of the Night: Deiveson Figueiredo vs. Alexandre Pantoja
Performance of the Night: Geoff Neal and Hakeem Dawodu

See also 

 List of UFC events
 2019 in UFC
 List of current UFC fighters

References 

Ultimate Fighting Championship events
Events in Edmonton
2019 in mixed martial arts
Mixed martial arts in Canada
Sports competitions in Edmonton
2019 in Alberta